The University of Montana was founded in 1893.

Timeline

Oscar John Craig (1895-1908)

Clyde Augustus Duniway (1908-1912)

Edwin Boone Craighead (1912-1915)

Frederick Charles Scheuch (Interim) (1915–1917)

Edward Octavius Sisson (1917-1921)

Personal and Accomplishments

Charles Horace Clapp (1921–1935)

Personal and Accomplishments

George Finlay Simmons (1936-1941)

Personal and Accomplishments

Ernest Oscar Melby (1941-1945)

Personal and Accomplishments

James Allen McCain (1945-1950)

Personal and Accomplishments

Carl McFarland (1951-1958)

Personal and Accomplishments

Harry Kenneth Newburn (1959-1963) 

Personal and Accomplishments

Robert Johns (1963-1966) 

Personal and Accomplishments

Robert T. Pantzer (1966-1974)

Personal and Accomplishments

Richard Charles Bowers (1974-1981) 

Personal and Accomplishments

Neil S. Bucklew (1981-1986)

Personal and Accomplishments

James Verch Koch (1986-1990)

Personal and Accomplishments

George M. Dennison (1990–2010)

Personal and Accomplishments

Royce Engstrom (2010-2016)

Personal and Accomplishments

Sheila Sterns (Interim) (2017 - 2018)

Personal and Accomplishments

Seth Bodnar (2018-)

Personal and Accomplishments

References